The Nuthe is a small river in Saxony-Anhalt, Germany. It flows into the Elbe north of Barby.

See also
List of rivers of Saxony-Anhalt

Rivers of Saxony-Anhalt
Rivers of Germany